State Highway 402 (SH 402) is a  state highway in Larimer County, Colorado, United States, that connects U.S. Route 287 (US 287) Loveland with Interstate 25/US 87 (I-25/US 87) in Johnstown.

Route description
The road begins at an intersection with US 287 in the southern part of Loveland. It begins as 14th Street through farmland along County Road 18 After intersecting County Road 9 and County Road 7, the road meets its east end at an diamond interchange with I-25/US 87, at exit 255.

History
The route was numbered and established in 1950 by the Colorado Department of Transportation from U.S. Highway 287 to Interstate 25. Four years later, the road was entirely paved. Since its establishment, the route has not been majorly adjusted.

Major intersections

See also

 List of state highways in Colorado

References

External links

402
Transportation in Larimer County, Colorado
Loveland, Colorado